Backyard Babies is the sixth studio album by the Swedish rock band Backyard Babies. The album was released on 13 August 2008 and reached number 1 on the Swedish albums chart, and debuted on the UK rock chart at number 29.

Recording
The album was recorded in the beginning of 2008 during 90 intensive days. It was produced by Swedish producer Jacob Hellner, who also worked with Rammstein and Apocalyptica.

Singles
The first single from the album was "Fuck Off and Die" and a video was made for the song. "Degenerated" was the second single by the band, and an animated music video was made for the song. "Nomadic" is the third single for the album.

Track listing 
"Fuck Off and Die" – 3:48
"Degenerated" – 3:39
"Come Undone" – 3:41
"Drool" – 3:25
"Abandon" – 4:21 (Backyard Babies, Thomander, Wikström)
"Voodoo Love Bow" – 3:23
"Idiots" – 3:07
"The Ship" – 3:08
"Nomadic" – 3:51 (Backyard Babies, Thomander, Wikström)
"Back on the Juice" – 3:37
"Where Were You?" – 3:19
"Zoe Is a Weirdo" – 1:55
"Saved by the Bell" – 3:55

All songs are written by Backyard Babies, except where noted.

Personnel
Nicke Borg – vocals, guitar
Dregen – lead guitar, vocals
Johan Blomqvist – bass
Peder Carlsson – drums

References

2008 albums
Backyard Babies albums

fi:Backyard Babies
sv:Backyard Babies